William Talman may refer to:

William Talman (actor) (1915–1968), American actor
William Talman (architect) (1650–1719), English architect

See also
Will Tallman, U.S. Representative